Anse-Bleue   is a community in the Canadian province of New Brunswick. The small community is located in New Bandon Parish in Gloucester County, northern New Brunswick, on the southern shore of Chaleur Bay. Most of the population is of Acadian descent and is located along the beach.

History

Notable people

References

Communities in Gloucester County, New Brunswick
Designated places in New Brunswick
Local service districts of Gloucester County, New Brunswick